Kim Eun-Hu (Hangul: 김은후; born 23 May 1990) is a South Korean footballer who plays as midfielder who currently plays for Mokpo City. He changed the name from "Kim Eui-Bum" to "Kim Eun-Hu".

Honors
Individual
 K-League Reserve League Top assistor : 2010

Career statistics

External links 

1990 births
Living people
Association football midfielders
South Korean footballers
FC Seoul players
Jeonbuk Hyundai Motors players
Gangwon FC players
K League 1 players
Korea National League players